Jan Pawlica (3 November 1923 – 18 October 1972) was a Polish alpine skier. He competed in the men's downhill at the 1948 Winter Olympics.

References

1923 births
1972 deaths
Polish male alpine skiers
Olympic alpine skiers of Poland
Alpine skiers at the 1948 Winter Olympics
Sportspeople from Zakopane
20th-century Polish people